Tibor Erdey-Grúz (27 October 1902 – 16 August 1976) was a Hungarian chemist and politician, who served as Minister of Higher Education between 1952 and 1953 and after that as Minister of Education from 1953 to 1956.

References
 Magyar Életrajzi Lexikon

1902 births
1976 deaths
People from Budapest
People from the Kingdom of Hungary
Members of the Hungarian Working People's Party
Education ministers of Hungary
Members of the National Assembly of Hungary (1953–1958)
Hungarian chemists
Electrochemists
Members of the Hungarian Academy of Sciences
Members of the German Academy of Sciences at Berlin